José Eduardo Martins Ormonde  was a Portuguese botanist and botanical illustrator.

References

1943 births
2004 deaths
20th-century Portuguese botanists